Sex trafficking in Indonesia is human trafficking for the purpose of sexual exploitation and slavery that occurs in Republic of Indonesia. Indonesia is a country of origin, destination,  and transit for sex trafficking. 

Sex trafficking victims in the country are from all ethnic groups in Indonesia and foreigners.
Children, migrants,  refugees, and people with low education or in poverty are vulnerable. Indonesian citizens, primarily women and girls, have been sex trafficked into other countries in Asia and different continents. Many are abducted, deceived and forced into prostitution and unfree labour. Victims are threatened and experience physically and psychologically abuse. They contract sexually transmitted diseases from rapes. They have been drugged and forced to take pills to delay menstruation to maximize profits. Some are coerced to be in online pornographic films.

The sex traffickers are often part of or collude with criminal syndicates. The traffickers have been creating accounts on pornographic sites and social media platforms in order to sell sex acts from their victims. Pedophiles and sex tourists travel to Indonesia. Australian and other foreigner paedophile rings had infiltrated Indonesia using the pretense of adopting or fostering impoverished children. Some perpetrators are victims of sex trafficking themselves.

The government of Indonesia has been criticized for the weak implementation of sex trafficking laws and poor victim protections. Some law enforcement have not received proper anti-trafficking training.

Non-governmental organizations
Compassion First, headquartered in Beaverton, Oregon, carries out anti-sex trafficking efforts in Indonesia.

See also 
 Human trafficking in Indonesia
 Prostitution in Indonesia

References 

Prostitution in Indonesia
Crime in Indonesia by type
Women in Indonesia
Indonesian women
Youth in Indonesia
Society of Indonesia
Human rights abuses in Indonesia
Indonesia